Langtree may refer to:

Places 
in England
 Langtree, Devon 
 Langtree, an area within the village of Standish, Greater Manchester
Langtree (hundred), an ancient subdivision of Oxfordshire

in Australia
 Langtree, New South Wales
 Langtree Nature Reserve in New South Wales
 Langtree stud farm, Benalla, Victoria

Education establishments 

 Langtree Elementary School in Trenton, New Jersey, USA
 Langtree School in Woodcote, Oxfordshire (near to Reading, Berkshire), England

Businesses 

 Langtree Group, a property investment and real estate development firm in Haydock, St Helens, Merseyside, England

Christian church 
 Langtree, a Church of England ministry in Oxfordshire, England

People 
 Andrew Langtree, (1977-), British stage and screen actor
 Charles Langtree, (deceased), Australian rules footballer

See also
Langtry (disambiguation)